The Merrimack Canal is a power canal in Lowell, Massachusetts.  The canal, dug in the 1820s, begins at the Pawtucket Canal just above Swamp Locks, and empties into the Merrimack River near the Boott Cotton Mills.  The Merrimack Canal was the first major canal to be dug at Lowell exclusively for power purposes, and delivered  of hydraulic head to the mills of the Merrimack Manufacturing Company. The Merrimack Manufacturing Company was the first of the major textile mills constructed in Lowell. It was demolished around 1960.

See also
Lowell Power Canal System and Pawtucket Gatehouse

References

External links

Canals in Massachusetts
Canals in Lowell, Massachusetts
Historic American Engineering Record in Massachusetts